Parcoursup is a Web portal designed by both the French Ministry of Education and the French Ministry of Higher Education, Research and Innovation, which manages the balance between undergraduate places in French universities and other higher education institutions, and the application of candidates with a high school diploma. The portal was released in 2018, and 666,000 candidates registered. In 2022, the site received applications from 626,653 students. In 2020, 17,123 undergraduate programmes are offered by Parcoursup.

Parcoursup used to replace a previous Web platform (APB Admission Post-Bac, launched in 2009), which substituted itself to the old system of random drawing between students to implement an examination of each student file. However, Parcoursup has suffered criticism. It is being blamed for creating anxiety among students, and being opaque because each university uses its own criteria to decide which students will be admitted. It has also be blamed for the amount of work it generates within universities. Indeed, Parcoursup allows students to make from 1 to 10 wishes with as many as 20 subwishes for each of them. Hence, undergraduate programs receive far more applications than they used to and some universities can have to consider more than 100,000 student files. This has led to tensions within French universities and contributed to a controversy between left- and right-wing parties.

References

External links 
 Official site

Higher education in France
Undergraduate education
University and college admissions